The Australian Good Design Awards, formerly known as the Australian International Design Awards and as the Australian Design Awards, is an Australian awards program operated by Good Design Australia. The awards program was originally established in 1958 by the Industrial Design Council of Australia (IDCA), and recognises achievements in industrial design.

In 2007 the Australian Design Awards expanded its entry criteria to include all professionally designed products on the Australian market, including products designed outside of Australia as well as those designed within the country. From 2007, the Australian Design Awards was renamed as the Australian International Design Awards to emphasise the inclusion of products not designed in Australia.

Projects recognised with an Australian Good Design Award demonstrate excellence in professional design and highlight the impact a design-led approach has on business success and social and environmental outcomes. Each entry is evaluated according to a strict set of design evaluation criteria which includes Good Design, Design Innovation and Design Impact. 

The Australian International Design Awards has been recognised by the Commonwealth Government and the International Council of Societies of Industrial Design as a promotional body for the Australian design industry.

Awards 
There are five types of accolades issued in the Australian Good Design Awards program: 
 Australian Good Design Award Winner accolade (recognising good design)
 Australian Good Design Award Gold accolade (recognising design excellence)
 Australian Good Design Award Best in Class accolade (recognising best in class design in each category) 
 Australian Good Design Award for Sustainability (recognising excellence in sustainable design) 
 Australian Good Design Award of the Year accolade (highest design honor in the awards and awarded to only one project)

Special Awards include:
 Australian Design Prize
 Good Design Team of the Year Award
 Michael Bryce Patron's Award
 Women in Design Award
 Indigenous Design Award
 Automotive Design Award
 Powerhouse Museum Design Award and Selection

History 

In 1958 the Industrial Design Council of Australia (IDCA) was established  funded by the Commonwealth Government. The goal was to educate manufacturers and consumers on the value of design, and encourage and promote high standards of design in manufactured goods.

From 1964 Good Design Labels began to appear on products and the Australian Design Index became a register of the best designed products in Australia. A panel of experts reviewed items for inclusion in the Index. Products meeting the criteria received the Good Design Label and other manufacturers were given constructive criticism on how to improve their products.

In 1964, the IDCA opened the first Australian Design Centre in Melbourne with an exhibition of selected products from the Australian Design Index. Federal and state government funding helped establish a new Design Centre in Sydney, with more centres to follow in other cities.

In 1967 the Prince Philip Prize for Australian Design was set up, supported by Prince Philip, Duke of Edinburgh, with the aim of promoting greater awareness of good design in Australian engineering. The inaugural Prince Philip Prize was awarded in 1968. Over 90 entries were received and the winning entry was a self-propelled grain header, designed by Kenneth Gibson. The Prince Philip Prize continued for twenty years.

The IDCA faced funding difficulties in the mid-1970s and was forced to close temporarily in 1976. A new funding injection from the Commonwealth Government helped the Council reopen and a new 'innovation' recognition program was introduced.

Recognising not only high quality but innovative Australian designed products, the Australian Design Award (ADA) program became a promotional tool for manufacturers and designers and provided a source of revenue for the IDCA to continue its operations. The Prince Philip Prize continued to be awarded, but only to products which had received the ADA.

Televised coverage of the Awards presentation on ABC TV reached audiences of over four million and in 1979, the first annual yearbook of ADA winners was published.

For the next two decades, however, continuing funding issues, dwindling industry support and a lack of clear direction plagued the IDCA. In 1987 in an effort to reinvigorate the movement, the government re-launched the IDCA as the Australian Design Council and the Prince Philip Prize was folded, leaving the ADA as Australia's top design accolade.

In 1991, control of the Australian Design Council and the ADA program moved to Standards Australia. Under Standards Australia, the ADA program continued to run, but the Australian Design Council was disbanded in 1993. New formats and incentives for the ADA program such as the Australian Design Mark certification scheme were trialed during the second half of the '90s without success. In 1997 a revamped format was introduced to the Awards, using an online application form and first round internet shortlisting. It attracted more than one hundred applications. The first Presentation Night was held at the Metro Theatre in Sydney. In 1998, profession-based categories were introduced.

However, the program was threatened by significant operating costs. The 1999 program was put on hold while Standards Australia explored other options to secure the future of the awards. The majority of staff was made redundant and for the first time in many years, no Design Awards were presented in Australia. The Design Institute of Australia was approached to take over the program but declined the financial commitment.

After developing a new business plan and financial model, the Board of Standards Australia approved another year for the awards. For the next few years, the ADA continued to grow in standing and support, buoyed by financial stability. A student design category was launched in 2002 supported by Dyson Appliances Australia and in 2004, product-focused categories were introduced.

In 2008, on the 50th anniversary of the awards program, internationally designed products available for sale in Australia were allowed to enter the awards for the first time.

In late 2010, Standards Australia transferred the awards program to a new organisation called Good Design Australia.

In 2015, the awards were renamed as the Australian Good Design Awards.

Previous winners 
Previous winners include:

 2019: Inventia - RASTRUM 3D Bioprinter (Product of the year)
Caroma's Invisi Series II Toilet Suite and H2Zero Cube Urinal
 Qantas A380 Economy Class Seat designed by Marc Newson, 
 Ford XE Falcon
 1987 Mitsubishi Magna wagon 
 Holden VT Commodore
 Ford AU Falcon
 Ford Territory
 Holden Commodore VE Sportswagon and Ute
 Blueye Sport Goggle designed by Paul Cohen
 Victa Lawn Mower
 Bionic Ear
 winged keel
 VentrAssist Artificial Heart
 Sunbeam Mixmaster
 Test Series Cricket Helmet
 RØDE Podcaster microphone
 Dolphin Torch
 Enzie Spiral Stair
 1974: P. A. Yeomans' Keyline plow, originally known as the Bunyip Slipper Imp

References

External links 
 Australian Good Design Awards
 Standards Australia
 AIDA Facebook Page

Awards established in 1958
Design awards
Industrial design
Design Award
1958 establishments in Australia